The Quincy Institute for Responsible Statecraft is a U.S. think tank founded in 2019 and located in Washington, D.C., named after former U.S. president John Quincy Adams. It has been described as realist and advocating for restraint in U.S. foreign policy.

History
The Quincy Institute was co-founded by Andrew Bacevich, a former US Army colonel in Vietnam and retired professor of history at Boston University.

Initial funding for the group, launched in November 2019, included half a million dollars each from George Soros' Open Society Foundations and Charles Koch's Koch Foundation. Substantial funding has also come from the Ford Foundation, the Carnegie Corporation of New York, the Rockefeller Brothers Fund, and Schumann Center for Media and Democracy. The institute distinguishes itself from many other think tanks in Washington, D.C. by refusing to accept money from foreign governments.

The think tank is named after U.S. President John Quincy Adams, who as Secretary of State said, in a speech on July 4, 1821, that the U.S. "goes not abroad in search of monsters to destroy". It has been described as "realist" and "promot[ing] an approach to the world based on diplomacy and restraint rather than threats, sanctions, and bombing".

David Klion wrote: "Quincy's founding members say again and again that 9/11 and the Iraq War were turning points in their careers." Many fellows at the institute are veterans of the wars in Iraq and Afghanistan.

Purpose
The Quincy Institute states that it is a nonprofit research organization and think tank that hosts scholars, participates in debates, publishes analysis pieces by journalists and academics, and advocates for a "less militarized and more cooperative foreign policy". According to its statement of purpose, it is opposed to the "military-industrial complex" described by President Dwight D. Eisenhower in his farewell address.

Co-founder Trita Parsi, an Iranian-born author and analyst, has described the Quincy Institute as "transpartisan", and, according to The Nation, has described the need for "an alliance of politicians on the left and right who agree on the need for restraint, even if they do so for different reasons". Bacevich said: "Our purpose is to promote restraint as a central principle of U.S. foreign policy — fewer wars and more effective diplomatic engagement."

According to The Nation, the Quincy Institute founders believe that the existing foreign policy elite is out of step with the American public, which is "far more skeptical of military adventurism". Mother Jones said that the Quincy Institute offers "a rare voice of dissent from foreign policy orthodoxy."

Daniel W. Drezner, writing in The Washington Post, described the institute as a "think tank that advocates a sober version of restraint", and said that it joined the Cato Institute, the Center for the National Interest, and New America "in the heterodox foreign policy basket".

Hal Brands, writing in Bloomberg News, described it as a "well-funded think tank" that is part of the "restraint coalition", a "loose network of analysts, advocates and politicians calling for a sharply reduced US role in the world".

Reception
Some writers have argued that the agenda of the Quincy Institute is in line with the Trump administration's foreign policy on some issues, such as negotiating with North Korea, but has a different approach from the Trump administration on others, such as U.S. involvement in the war in Yemen.

Writing in Survival, the journal of the International Institute for Strategic Studies, Daniel Deudney and John Ikenberry criticized the "restraints" that the Quincy Institute advocates for as "misplaced and inadequate". Deudney and Ikenberry argue that liberal internationalism would offer a more historically effective basis for institution-based restraint, than transactional agreements between states supported by the geopolitical restraint school.

In January 2020, The Jerusalem Post reported that a number of fellows of the institute, including Lawrence Wilkerson, Stephen Walt, and John Mearsheimer, had been accused of antisemitism for the ways they have criticized the Israel lobby in the United States, AIPAC, and Israel. One such accusation came from Republican U.S. Senator Tom Cotton, describing it as an "isolationist, blame America First money pit for so-called scholars who've written that American foreign policy could be fixed if only it were rid of the malign influence of Jewish money." Quincy president Andrew Bacevich described Cotton's claim as "absurd".

According to an April 2021 article in Tablet, two Quincy Institute fellows have cast doubt on whether the Chinese government's persecution of the Uyghur population amounts to a genocide.

During the 2022 Russian invasion of Ukraine, there were two resignations in protest at the institute's dovish response to the conflict: non-resident fellow Joseph Cirincione of Ploughshares Fund, who had raised money for Quincy, and board member Paul Eaton, a retired senior Army major officer and adviser to Democratic politicians and liberal advocacy groups. Cirincione said he "fundamentally" disagrees with Quincy experts who "completely ignore the dangers and the horrors of Russia’s invasion and occupation and focus almost exclusively on criticism of the United States, NATO, and Ukraine". Eaton said he resigned because he "supports NATO". Parsi responded by saying that Cirincione's criticisms "were not only false but bewildering," and were easily disproved by "a quick glance at our website."

Co-founders
The Quincy Institute's co-founders include:
 Andrew Bacevich, president
 Eli Clifton, senior advisor
 Suzanne DiMaggio, chairman
 Trita Parsi, executive vice president
 Stephen Wertheim

References

Further reading
 
 David Klion, "Go Not Abroad in Search of Monsters:  The Quincy Institute, a new DC think tank, will fight the Blob at home while advocating restraint overseas", The Nation, vol. 309, no. 3 (August 12 / 19, 2019), pp. 18–21.

External links 
 

2019 establishments in Washington, D.C.
Foreign policy and strategy think tanks in the United States
Nonpartisan organizations in the United States
Think tanks based in Washington, D.C.
Organizations established in 2019
Peace and conflict studies
George Soros
Koch family
Non-interventionism